José Iván Morales Elvira (born 9 October 1991) is a Mexican professional boxer who challenged for the IBF bantamweight title in 2016. He is the younger brother of both Diego Morales and of Erik Morales.

Professional career
In December 2009, Iván knocked out Cristian Zavala to win his pro debut in Rosarito, Baja California, Mexico.

See also
Notable boxing families

References

External links
 

Boxers from Baja California
Sportspeople from Tijuana
Bantamweight boxers
1991 births
Living people
Mexican male boxers